Meridian is a small and old unincorporated community in northwestern Leon County, Florida, United States.

Location
Meridian is located on the west side of Lake Iamonia on N. Meridian Road, 12 miles north of Tallahassee.

History

Antebellum 
Meridian started as the center and community gathering place for nearby antebellum cotton plantations of Burgesstown, the William A. Carr Plantation, Bannerman Plantation, the James A. Kirksey Plantation, and the G.W. Holland Plantation.

20th Century 
In 1940, Meridian consisted of 20 homes in the immediate area and 20 more homes, a church, and school in the outlying area north of Meridian on N. Meridian Road. A saw mill was located south and east of Meridian.

Today, Meridian is still a community of several large homes and estates.

Political 

Note: DePuy was appointed by Governor Jeb Bush in 2004.

References
Paisley, Clifton. From Cotton to Quail, University Press of Florida 1989.

Unincorporated communities in Leon County, Florida
Tallahassee metropolitan area
History of Leon County, Florida
Unincorporated communities in Florida